Mel B. Feany (born ) is an American neuropathologist and geneticist at Brigham and Women's Hospital who researches neurodegenerative disease. She is  a co-editor of the Annual Review of Pathology: Mechanisms of Disease.

Early life and education
Mel B. Feany, the daughter of Pat and Marion Feany, grew up in Prineville, Oregon. She was an only child and enjoyed visiting the library. She graduated from Crook County High School in 1982, at the age of sixteen as her class's valedictorian. She earned a bachelor's degree in neuroscience from Harvard University, staying to earn a PhD in 1993 with advisors Margaret Livingstone and Kathleen Buckley. She then attended the Albert Einstein College of Medicine at Yeshiva University for her Doctor of Medicine.

Career
Feany completed a medical residency in anatomic pathology at Brigham and Women's Hospital, followed by a fellowship in neuropathology. She primarily researches the fruit fly Drosophila as a model for human neurodegenerative disorders like Alzheimer's disease and Parkinson's disease. She is currently a professor of pathology at Harvard University at Brigham and Women's Hospital. She is a co-editor of the Annual Review of Pathology: Mechanisms of Disease.

Selected publications

Awards and honors
Feany was awarded the Outstanding Investigator Award from the American Society for Investigative Pathology in 2009. In 2019 she was awarded the Landis Award for Outstanding Mentorship from the National Institute of Neurological Disorders and Stroke.

References

Living people
1960s births
People from Prineville, Oregon
Harvard University alumni	
Albert Einstein College of Medicine alumni	
Harvard Medical School faculty
American neuropathologists
American geneticists
Annual Reviews (publisher) editors